Vicki Chong is a former association football player who represented New Zealand at international level.

Chong made a single appearance for Football Ferns in a 0–1 loss to Russia on 28 August 1994.

References

Year of birth missing (living people)
Living people
New Zealand women's international footballers
New Zealand women's association footballers
Women's association footballers not categorized by position